King's Museum is a small university museum operated by the University of Aberdeen and located in the Old Town House in Old Aberdeen, Scotland.

History

The museum collection's origin was originally established in King's College in 1727. A dedicated museum opened at No. 17 High Street in April 2011, but the collection was re-located to the Old Town House in the High Street in 2013. The collections are used for teaching and research, both within the University of Aberdeen community, and by visiting academic researchers. The museum has hosted a number of temporary exhibitions featuring items from the university collections. The University of Aberdeen's collections are among the largest and most important in Scotland, having been granted the status of a Recognised Collection of National Significance by Museums Galleries Scotland.

The museum closed in March 2020 during the Covid-19 pandemic, initially to support the public health response to the pandemic in the city of Aberdeen. As of December 2022, no plans had been announced to reopen.

Schools Service 
The museum runs a schools service for primary school classes in Aberdeen City and Aberdeenshire. Workshops are offered on a variety of topics, and all workshops link in with the Scottish Curriculum for Excellence.

Events 
The museum runs an evening lecture series on Tuesdays throughout the university term time, and also participates in national and international events, such as the annual "Night at the Museums" event, part of the ICOM European Night of Museums and Museums Galleries Scotland's Festival of Museums.

References

External links
 King's Museum - official site

Museums in Aberdeen
University of Aberdeen
University museums in Scotland
2011 establishments in Scotland
Museums established in 2011